The Liberation Trilogy is a series of military history books about the United States' involvement in World War II, written by American author Rick Atkinson and published by Henry Holt & Co.

The first volume, An Army at Dawn, won the 2003 Pulitzer Prize for History and was a New York Times best seller. The Day of Battle, the second book, was also a New York Times best seller, and the final installment, The Guns at Last Light, debuted at the top of the Hardcover Nonfiction list.

Books
 An Army at Dawn: The War in North Africa, 1942–1943 (2002)
 The Day of Battle: The War in Sicily and Italy, 1943–1944 (2007)
 The Guns at Last Light: The War in Western Europe, 1944–1945 (2013)

References

2002 non-fiction books
2007 non-fiction books
2013 non-fiction books
Henry Holt and Company books
History books about the United States
Literary trilogies
Series of history books about World War II
Book series introduced in 2002